The Mad Capsule Market's is a compilation album by Japanese rock band The Mad Capsule Markets. All of the songs have been re-recorded and two have been remixed. On this version of "HI-SIDE", the band displayed more experimentation with the English language and "Walk!!" was remixed by respected dub artist Adrian Sherwood. This was the last album that guitarist Ai Ishigaki played on, and he was later replaced by support guitarist TORUxxx.

Track listing
"Possess in Loop!!!!!!!!!!" 
"Mix-ism"
"S. S. Music" 
"Mass Media" 
"Hi-Side" 
"Parasite (Kiseichuu)"
"Jesus is Dead? Jesus is Alive?" (Bryan New Mix Version) 
"G.M.J.P" 
"Down in the System [System Error]" 
"La~la~la~ (Boku ga usotsuki ni natta hi)" La~la~la~ (The Day I Became a Liar) 
"Walk!" (Adrian Sherwood Remix)

Charts

References

The Mad Capsule Markets albums
1996 compilation albums